Azopardo may refer to:

 Azopardo Airport, an airport located near Timaukel, Chile.
 Azopardo River, a river in Isla Grande de Tierra del Fuego, Chile.
 Juan Bautista Azopardo, a Maltese privateer and officer of the Argentine Navy during the Independence and Cisplatine wars.
 , an anti-submarine frigate in service with the Argentine Navy from 1955 to 1972.
 , a Mantilla-class patrol boat in service with the Argentine Naval Prefecture since 1983.